KIHK (106.9 FM, "Hawk Country 106.9") is a radio station broadcasting a country music format. Located near Rock Valley, Iowa, United States, the station serves the Sioux Center, Iowa area, along with rimshot coverage in Sioux Falls, South Dakota.  The station is currently owned by Sorenson Broadcasting Corp.

History
The station was assigned the call letters KDUT on 1996-02-01. On 1997-03-31, the station changed its call sign to the current KIHK.

References

External links

IHK
Country radio stations in the United States